The General Mosconi neighbourhood is located three kilometres (2 miles) away from the downtown of Comodoro Rivadavia to the north, in Chubut, Argentina.

There are several monuments commemorating important figures such as General Enrique Mosconi. This place was developed with the oil industry.

In the neighbourhood there is a huge variety of places and shops such as supermarkets, clothes stores, DVD rental houses, bakeries, a bank, pharmacies, cafes, ice-cream shops, drugstores, cybers, a post office, schools and even a hospital.

The houses and the structure of the buildings are quite quaint, which reflects the past as ex-YPF properties.

One of the most popular places in the neighbourhood and in the city is the Sports Club Ingeniero Luis A. Huergo, in which all the sports and cultural events are held. It is also the place where all national rock bands and musicians perform. Another historical place is the Catholic School for boys, Dean Funes School, which is next to the local church Santa Lucia.

The development of this neighbourhood took place together with that of the oil activity, that is why the Oil Museum was built here in 1987 by the company YPF and it is nowadays run by the National University Patagonia San Juan Bosco. The museum is very important because there is a lot of historical machinery and a replica of the famous Oil Well n° 2, where oil was first discovered in Comodoro Rivadavia in 1907.

Neighbourhoods in Argentina
Populated places in Chubut Province